Rupe Branch (also called Roupes Branch) is a stream in Cooper County in the U.S. state of Missouri.

Rupe Branch was named after Gilland Roupe, a pioneer citizen.

See also
List of rivers of Missouri

References

Rivers of Cooper County, Missouri
Rivers of Missouri